Sara Ann DeCosta (born May 13, 1977) is an American ice hockey player. She won a gold medal at the 1998 Winter Olympics, and a silver medal at the 2002 Winter Olympics.

Biography

She is the daughter of Nancy and Frank DeCosta.  She was born in and grew up in Warwick, Rhode Island, and is Jewish. She is an alumna of Toll Gate High School, where she played goalie on the boys' hockey team. DeCosta is married, and the couple has three children.

She attended Providence College ('00), where she was a hockey goalie, and  allowed only 177 goals with 2,324 saves in 85 games.  She graduated with a degree in social science, with concentrations in sociology and psychology.

She won a gold medal at the 1998 Winter Olympics (she had three wins, one a shutout, with a 1.59 goals-against average and a .875 save percentage) and a silver medal at the 2002 Winter Olympics , where she had the best goals-against average and save percentage.

She won a World Championship silver medal in 2000, had the best GAA (0.50) and the best SVS% (.975) at the 2001 World Championship where she again won a silver medal, and had the best GAA (1.00) and the best SVS% (.948) at the 2002 World Championship where she again won a silver medal.
	
DeCosta was USA Hockey Women's Player of the Year in 2000. In 2002–03, she was a volunteer coach for the women's hockey team at Providence. She was the goaltending coach for the Harvard Crimson women's ice hockey team in 2008–09.

DeCosta was named by Brandeis University, a contemporary Jewish sports heroine.

Awards and honors
2000 and 2002 USA Hockey Women's Player of the Year Award  (also known as the Bob Allen Women's Player of the Year award) 
2004 - inducted into the Rhode Island Heritage Hall of Fame.
2018 - inducted into the Rhode Island Hockey Hall of Fame.

See also
List of select Jewish ice hockey players

References

External links

1977 births
American women's ice hockey goaltenders
Ice hockey players from Rhode Island
Ice hockey players at the 1998 Winter Olympics
Ice hockey players at the 2002 Winter Olympics
Jewish American sportspeople
Jewish ice hockey players
Living people
Medalists at the 1998 Winter Olympics
Medalists at the 2002 Winter Olympics
Olympic gold medalists for the United States in ice hockey
Olympic silver medalists for the United States in ice hockey
Providence Friars women's ice hockey players
Sportspeople from Warwick, Rhode Island
21st-century American Jews
21st-century American women